Herr Mannelig (also known as Bergatrollets frieri "The Courting of the Mountain Troll") is a Swedish folk ballad (SMB 26; TSB A 59) that tells the story of a female mountain troll (bergatroll) who proposes marriage to a young human man.
The troll is trying to convince "Sir Mannelig" (Herr Mannelig) to marry her. She offers him many gifts but he refuses her because she is not a Christian. It's also implied that the troll is actually a pagan woman, and that the song symbolizes a young Christian man resisting material gain that would come with apostasy.

History
The ballad was first published 1877 as a folk song of the Södermanland region (recorded in Lunda parish, Nyköping Municipality). A variant from Näshulta parish, Eskilstuna Municipality, published in the same collection in 1882, had the title Skogsjungfruns frieri ("The Courting of the Wood-nymph", a skogsjungfru or skogsnufva being a female wood-nymph or fairy).
Other variants have been recorded in which the courted man is called "Herr Magnus" (Herr Magnus och Hafstrollet, Hertig Magnus och Hafsfrun, a hafstroll or hafsfru being a water-nymph, neck or mermaid). Certain variants appear to identify the ballad's protagonist as Magnus, Duke of Östergötland, incorporating an alleged incident in which the duke, old and mentally impaired, threw himself into the water after seeing such a water spirit waving to him. Hertig Magnus och sjöjungfrun ("Duke Magnus and the Mermaid") is an 1862 operetta by Ivar Hallström (libretto by Frans Hedberg).

The lyrics of the ballad published in 1877 are in seven verses, with a refrain in the troll's voice (Herr Mannelig trolofven I mig, "Sir Mannelig will you be betrothed to me?"). 
The first verse gives an exposition, saying of the troll "she had a false tongue" (Hon hade en falskeliger tunga), suggesting that the troll is trying to deceive the young man; this is in contrast to the Näshulta variant, which has hon sjong med så rörande tunga ("she sang with touching [emotionally affecting] tongue", which may or may not imply deception).
Verses 2–5 are in the troll's voice, promising gifts of twelve steeds, twelve mills, a gilded sword and a silken shirt, respectively; 
verse 6 is in the man's voice, rejecting the proposal, calling the troll "of the tribe of the neck and the devil" (af Neckens och djävulens stämma, while in the Näshulta he declines because he swore not to marry a heathen). 
The final verse has the troll running away wailing ("Had I got the handsome young man / I would have avoided my torment" Hade jag fått den fager ungersven / Så hade jag mistat min plåga).
The Näshulta variant is closely related, but has an additional five verses listing promised gifts, the list of promises being (verses 2–10): 
a castle, twelve horses, a stable, twelve mills, a gilded sword, a silken shirt, a cap of red damask, a blue mantle, and finally treasure of gold and diamonds.

The theme is of the "Fairies' Hope for Christian Salvation" type (no. 5050) in the classification of Christansen (1958); the same theme was notably adapted by Hans Christian Andersen in The Little Mermaid (Den Lille Havfrue, 1837), influenced by Friedrich de la Motte Fouqué's Undine of 1811, and ultimately based on the theory by Paracelsus that there are certain nature spirits who lack a soul and are therefore "willing to surrender their carefee lives to marry a mortal, experience human suffering, and thereby win spiritual immortality".
In German folklore, the theme is expressed more typically by the water-nymph trying to draw the young man into perdition rather than trying to be saved by him (c.f. Der Fischer by Goethe 1779; Loreley by Clemens Brentano 1801). The sexes are reversed in the German ballad  Es freit ein wilder Wassermann, recorded 1813 in Joachimsthal, Brandenburg, where a male water spirit woos a young woman.

The song in the 1877 version has become popular in the Neofolk, Folk rock or Neo-Medieval musical genres since the late 1990s, following its inclusion 
in the album Guds spelemän by Garmarna in 1996. Later performances include 
In Extremo, Verehrt und angespien (1999), Haggard, Eppur Si Muove (2004),  Heimataerde, Dark Dance (2009), 
Midnattsol, The Aftermath (2018), SKÁLD, Huldufólk (2023), among others.

Lyrics

See also
 Nordic folk music
 Melusine
 Palästinalied
 "Herr Magnus og Bjærgtrolden"

References

Swedish folk songs
1877 songs
Songwriter unknown